Clayton Rodney McDonald (born 26 December 1988) is an English semi-professional footballer who plays as a defender.

He graduated out of the Manchester City youth academy in 2008, and spent the 2008–09 season on loan at League Two sides Macclesfield Town and Chesterfield. He spent the start of the 2009–10 season on loan at Walsall, before the deal was made permanent in December 2009. He was released by the club at the end of the 2010–11 campaign, at which point he signed with Port Vale. He joined Bristol Rovers on loan in January 2013. Port Vale secured promotion out of League Two in 2012–13. He signed with Grimsby Town in July 2013, before briefly joining Tranmere Rovers a year later. He signed with Southport in September 2014, and moved to Redditch United in February 2015 and then Worcester City in June 2015. He was loaned out to Corby Town in the 2015–16 season, before rejoining Redditch United in June 2016. He signed with Altrincham in December 2016, and then switched to Droylsden the following month. He signed with Nantwich Town for the 2017–18 season, and also signed with Whitchurch Alport on dual registration forms in September 2018.

Career

Manchester City
A graduate of the Manchester City youth set-up, McDonald signed his first professional contract with Manchester City. He then turned professional in 2008. He signed on loan for Macclesfield Town in August 2008, and made his competitive debut in a 2–0 defeat at Accrington Stanley on 23 August. He was substituted in the 70th minute after picking up an injury. Macclesfield manager Keith Alexander commented that "He did a good job for us, I was delighted with his performance" and "for a young lad to come in and do so well, it augurs well for the future." Alexander stated they had an option to extend the loan, but both parties agreed it would be best if he returned to his parent club. McDonald signed on loan for Chesterfield on transfer deadline day, 2 February 2009, initially on a one-month emergency loan. On his return to Manchester, he played for the Reserves in the Manchester Senior Cup final on 9 March, in the 1–0 defeat to Manchester United Reserves at Ewen Fields, Hyde.

Walsall
McDonald signed a one-month loan deal with Walsall in September 2009. His father previously played for the club. Manager Chris Hutchings said "he's a talented young lad. He's strong in the air, tackles well and can play." He impressed Hutchings, who twice had the loan extended for an extra month, before he signed for Walsall on a permanent basis in December 2009, following the player's release from Manchester City. The decision to leave City for Walsall won him praise from new teammate Troy Deeney. He played 27 games in the 2009–10 campaign, and picked up his first senior goal on 16 February, in a 2–1 victory over Leeds United at Elland Road. He was more of a bit-part player in Walsall's 2010–11 season, making just seventeen appearances. In April 2011 he picked up a shoulder injury that would keep him out of action for the rest of the season.

Port Vale
After being told he would not be retained by the "Saddlers", he was due to sign a contract at Port Vale in June 2011, but failed a medical due to a shoulder injury. Regardless of this he signed a six-month deal with the club the following month. He aimed to regain his fitness, win a first team place, and thereby earn a longer stay at Vale Park. He quickly managed to achieve the first two of these goals by October, as he started nine of Vale's first fourteen games of the season. He achieved the third target in December, signing a contract lasting until the end of the 2011–12 season, having already made eighteen appearances in league and cup. However his next contribution to Vale's campaign would be his 64th minute sending off at Southend United, following a second bookable offence. He returned to the first team after serving his suspension, but received his second red card of the campaign on 17 March after receiving a second yellow card 47 minutes into a defeat at Crawley Town. He played 31 games for the "Valiants" with a court case hanging over his head, though boss Micky Adams said that there would be "no favours" for the player for proving his innocence and insisted that his decision on whether or not to offer a contract to McDonald would be based on the footballing ability he had shown over the course of the campaign. Though suspensions and court appearances limited his contribution to the campaign, he still managed to post 33 first team appearances in 2011–12. He accepted Adams' offer of a new one-year contract in May 2012; Adams stated that "I'm obviously pleased Clayton has agreed to sign. He has done well since he has been at the club and has the potential to do even better. He was under a lot of stress with everything that was going on last season, but now he can get his mind clear and concentrate totally on football."

After David Artell left the club, Gareth Owen picked up an injury and Joe Davis suffered a loss of form, McDonald managed to build a solid centre-back partnership with John McCombe at the start of the 2012–13 campaign, but was warned to lose weight and improve his fitness by manager Micky Adams. He scored his first goal for the club in a 3–2 win against Forest Green Rovers at The New Lawn on 3 November, in the First Round of the FA Cup; during the match he also made a goal-line clearance with the score at 2–2. Speaking after the game, McDonald said "I'm just trying to pay back the fans and the manager for all their support in the past with performances on the pitch. Hopefully it's the first of many... hopefully I can catch Tom Pope up. The support they have given me has meant a lot to me. They are a top bunch of people, it's a top area." However the arrival of new signings Darren Purse and Liam Chilvers displaced McDonald from the first team picture. On 21 January, he joined Bristol Rovers on loan until the end of the season, as cover for the injured Garry Kenneth. The "Pirates" were then bottom of the English Football League, and manager John Ward said that McDonald was "prepared to come down for the cause [of avoiding relegation] and that's a really big plus for me." However McDonald remained on the bench as the "Gas" lost only three of their next 15 games, and had to wait until Tom Parkes received a suspension before he finally started a game for the club on 6 April, in a 1–0 win at the Memorial Stadium that saw Rovers climb into 11th place. He returned to Vale in time to see the club secure promotion with a third-place finish. He was not offered a new contract at the end of the season and was released as a free agent.

Grimsby Town
McDonald signed a one-year contract with Grimsby Town of the Conference Premier in July 2013. On 19 November, McDonald scored his first goal for the "Mariners" by providing the winner in a 2–1 victory over local rivals Scunthorpe United in the FA Cup First Round. He was a key first team player until losing his place due to injury. He played 17 league games during the 2013–14 campaign as Grimsby secured a play-off spot, losing to Gateshead at the semi-final stage. He was released by manager Paul Hurst in May 2014.

Tranmere Rovers
In August 2014, McDonald joined newly relegated League Two club Tranmere Rovers on non-contract terms as manager Rob Edwards was impressed by his ability but not convinced about his fitness levels. However, he left the club later in the month after making just one first team appearance. McDonald later stated "I'm gutted. I have just lost my job at Tranmere Rovers because all this stuff (Rape acquittal) that keeps re-appearing in the newspapers and on TV. It's so hard to move on with all this publicity."

Non-League
McDonald signed for Martin Foyle's Southport of the Conference Premier in September 2014. After playing in 13 games on a non-contract basis McDonald was released on 28 December 2014. He joined Southern League side Redditch United in February 2015. The next month Kidderminster Harriers manager Gary Whild tried to sign him, but McDonald chose to stay with Redditch. The "Reds" missed out on the play-offs in the 2014–15 season after finishing one point and one place behind St Neots Town.

He signed with Worcester City of the National League North in June 2015. He joined league rivals Corby Town on a three-month loan deal in October. He captained Corby during his loan spell. He rejoined Redditch United in June 2016 after the club's supporters agree to pay his wages; he cited manager Darren Byfield and the enthusiasm of the supporters as the two major factors in his decision to join the club. He joined National League North side Altrincham in December 2016. He moved onto Northern Premier League Division One North club Droylsden the following month. The "Bloods" finished 13th in the 2016–17 season.

McDonald joined Northern Premier League Premier Division side Nantwich Town in the summer of 2017. The "Dabbers" posted a 16th-place finish in the 2017–18 season. On 16 September 2018, he joined North West Counties League Division One club Whitchurch Alport on dual registration terms. As a result of the COVID-19 pandemic in England, the 2019–20 season was formally abandoned on 26 March, with all results from the season being expunged. The 2020–21 season was also curtailed due to the ongoing pandemic.

Personal life

Family
His father, Rod, was previously a professional footballer who played for Walsall, Partick Thistle, Chester City, and numerous other non-league clubs. His younger brother, also named Rod, is also a professional footballer, and played for Stoke City and Oldham Athletic after leaving the Manchester City Academy in 2005.

2012 acquittal of rape charge

On 20 April 2012 after a trial at the Crown Court at Caernarfon before His Honour Judge Merfyn Hughes QC and a jury, McDonald was acquitted of the rape of a woman at a Premier Inn in Rhuddlan on 30 May. His co-defendant and former Manchester City teammate, Ched Evans, was convicted of the charge, and sentenced to five years imprisonment. McDonald's lawyer stated after his acquittal that: "Clayton McDonald has maintained his innocence from the start and is relieved at his verdict. However, he is very upset and disappointed regarding the verdict given to his lifelong friend, Ched Evans, whom he will continue to support in any way possible." Evans went on to have his conviction quashed, and was found not guilty at his retrial in October 2016.

In October 2014, after Ched Evans was released from prison, McDonald claimed that his career and life had been "destroyed" by the rape trial, even though he was acquitted.

Career statistics

Honours
Port Vale
League Two third-place promotion: 2012–13

References

External links

1988 births
Living people
Footballers from Liverpool
Black British sportspeople
Association football defenders
English footballers
Manchester City F.C. players
Macclesfield Town F.C. players
Chesterfield F.C. players
Walsall F.C. players
Port Vale F.C. players
Bristol Rovers F.C. players
Grimsby Town F.C. players
Tranmere Rovers F.C. players
Southport F.C. players
Redditch United F.C. players
Worcester City F.C. players
Corby Town F.C. players
Altrincham F.C. players
Droylsden F.C. players
Nantwich Town F.C. players
Whitchurch Alport F.C. players
English Football League players
National League (English football) players
Southern Football League players
Northern Premier League players
People acquitted of rape